Littoraria is a genus of sea snails, marine gastropod mollusks in the family Littorinidae, the winkles or periwinkles.

There are more than fifty species in this genus of which more than 20 species are believed to be synonyms of Littoraria scabra, a very variable species.

Many of the species in this genus occur in the Indo-West Pacific region and in the Tropical Eastern Pacific, where they are found in large numbers on the trunks, trees and prop roots of tropical mangrove forests a few metres above high tide level. These snails feed on the thin film of algae, epiphytes, fungi, diatoms and leaf epidermis of these mangroves. The species living on higher levels of the trees have thinner shells, and are more variable in shell colour.

Within this genus, Littoraria aberrans is the only ovoviviparous species with an intracapsular metamorphosis.

Species
Species in the genus Littoraria include:

Littoraria aberrans Philippi, 1846
Littoraria ahenea Reid, 1986 
Littoraria albicans Metcalfe, 1852
Littoraria angulifera Lamarck, 1822 - mangrove periwinkle
Littoraria angulifera hessei Boettger 1912
Littoraria ardouiniana (Heude, 1885)
Littoraria articulata Philippi, 1846
Littoraria bengalensis Reid, 2001
Littoraria carinifera Menke, 1830
Littoraria cingulata Philippi, 1846
Littoraria cingulifera Dunker, 1845
Littoraria coccinea (Gmelin, 1791)
Littoraria conica Philippi, 1846
Littoraria delicatula Nevill, 1885
Littoraria filosa (G.B. Sowerby I, 1832)
Littoraria fasciata Sowerby, 1832
† Littoraria flammea Philippi, 1847
Littoraria flava King & Broderip, 1832
Littoraria flavaosa King & Broderip, 1832
Littoraria ianthostoma Stuckey & D.G. Reid, 2002
Littoraria intermedia Philippi, 1846
Littoraria irrorata Say, 1822 - marsh periwinkle
Littoraria lutea Philippi, 1847
Littoraria luteola Quoy & Gaimard, 1833
 † Littoraria massicardi Pacaud, 2019 
Littoraria mauritiana Lamarck, 1822
Littoraria melanostoma Gray, 1839
Littoraria miodelicatula Oyama, 1950 
Littoraria nebulosa Lamarck, 1822 - cloudy periwinkle
Littoraria obesa Gmelin, 1791
Littoraria pallescens Philippi, 1846
Littoraria philippiana Reeve, 1857
Littoraria pintado Wood, 1820
Littoraria pintado pullata Carpenter, 1864
Littoraria planaxis Philippi, 1846 
 † Littoraria prevostina (Basterot, 1825) 
Littoraria punctata Philippi, 184  
Littoraria rosewateri Reid, 1999
Littoraria scabra Philippi, 1847
Littoraria sinensis Philippi, 1847
Littoraria strigata Philippi, 1846
 † Littoraria subangulata (Deshayes, 1861) 
Littoraria subvittata Reid, 1986
Littoraria sulculosa Philippi, 1846
Littoraria tessellata Philippi, 1847
Littoraria undulata Gray, 1839
Littoraria varia Sowerby, 1832
Littoraria variegata Souleyet, in Eydoux & Souleyet,  1852
Littoraria vespacea Reid, 1986
Littoraria zebra Donovan, 1825 - zebra periwinkle

Species brought into synonymy
 Littoraria dantaae Y.-F. Fang, Y.-J. Peng, G.-J. Zhang & J. He, 2012: synonym of Mainwaringia dantaae Y.-F. Fang, Y.-J. Peng, G.-J. Zhang & J. He, 2012
Littoraria glabrata Philippi, 1846 : synonym of Littoraria coccinea glabrata (Philippi, 1846)
 Littoraria kraussi (Rosewater, 1970): synonym of Littoraria coccinea glabrata (Philippi, 1846)
 Littoraria pulchra Gray, 1833: synonym of Littoraria zebra (Donovan, 1825) (junior synonym)

References

Further reading

REID, D G 1986. The Littorinid Molluscs of Mangrove Forests in the Indo-Pacific Region: the genus Littoraria. British Museum (Natural History), London. 228 pp.

 Reid, D. G., P. Dyal, and S. T. Williams. "Global diversification of mangrove fauna: a molecular phylogeny of Littoraria (Gastropoda: Littorinidae)." Molecular phylogenetics and evolution 55.1 (2010): 185-201.

Littorinidae
Gastropod genera
Taxa named by Edward Griffith (zoologist)
Taxonomy articles created by Polbot